Scinote may refer to:
Scientific notation, a form of numeric notation
Scientific pitch notation, a form of musical notation
sciNote (software)